Diceroprocta swalei is a species of cicada in the family Cicadidae. It is found in Central America and North America.

Subspecies
These two subspecies belong to the species Diceroprocta swalei:
 Diceroprocta swalei davisi Metcalf, 1963
 Diceroprocta swalei swalei (Distant, 1904)

References

Further reading

 
 

Articles created by Qbugbot
Insects described in 1904
Diceroprocta